Sir Geoffrey Ivor de Deney  (8 October 1931 – 19 November 2015) was a British civil servant.

He was educated at St Edmund Hall, Oxford, and then carried out National Service as an officer in the North Staffordshire Regiment. He subsequently joined the Civil Service. After a career in the Home Office, he served as Clerk of the Privy Council between 1984 and 1992. He was made Knight Commander of the Royal Victorian Order in the 1992 Birthday Honours. In 1990, he was awarded the New Zealand 1990 Commemoration Medal.

After retirement from the Civil Service in 1992 he worked as the first Chief Executive of the Royal College of Anaesthetists.

References

1931 births
2015 deaths
Alumni of St Edmund Hall, Oxford
British civil servants
Clerks of the Privy Council
Knights Commander of the Royal Victorian Order
North Staffordshire Regiment officers